
The Santa María Magdalena de Pazzis Cemetery is a colonial-era cemetery located in Old San Juan, Puerto Rico. It is the final resting place of many of Puerto Rico's most prominent natives and residents. Construction began in 1863 under the auspices of Ignacio Mascaro. The cemetery is located outside the walls of Fort San Felipe del Morro fortress, one of the island's most famous landmarks. The average height of the wall is 40 feet and the width ranges from 15 to 20 feet. It was named in honor of Saint Maria Magdalena de Pazzi.

According to Rafael Rodríguez, Chaplain and director of pastoral services at the Universidad del Sagrado Corazón located in the Santurce district of the capital, the location of the cemetery is central to the Puerto Rican belief in the separation of death and life. The colonial Spanish government at the time construction of the cemetery commenced, viewed death with fear because it was a mystery. Therefore, they decided to build the cemetery to overlook the Atlantic Ocean to symbolize the spirit's journey to cross over to the afterlife.

Notable interments

 Pedro Albizu Campos, nationalist leader and politician
 Aurora de Albornoz, scholar, poet
 José Julián Acosta, abolitionist, journalist
 Ricardo Alegría, father of modern Puerto Rican archaeology
 Miguel Ángel Álvarez, journalist, comedian and actor
 Jose Celso Barbosa, founder of the Puerto Rican statehood movement
 Antonio R. Barceló, lawyer, businessman and politician
 Félix Benítez Rexach, architect and engineer
 Salvador Brau, journalist, poet and historian
 Norma Candal, actress
 Gilberto Concepción de Gracia, politician, founder of the Puerto Rican Independence Party
 Rafael Cordero, known as "The Father of Public Education in Puerto Rico".
 Tony Croatto, Italian-Puerto Rican folk singer, composer and television presenter
 Tite Curet Alonso, composer
 Conchita Dapena, former First Lady of Puerto Rico
 José de Diego, poet, lawyer and liberal politician
  Manuel Fernandez Juncos, Spanish writer, poet, journalist, writer of Puerto Rican national anthem
 José Ferrer, Academy Award-winning actor and director
 Miguel Ferrer, actor, José Ferrer's son
 Pedro Flores, composer
 José Gautier Benítez, poet
 Rafael Hernández, composer and musician
 Victoria Hernández, music entrepreneur and musician
 Santiago Iglesias, former Resident Commissioner of Puerto Rico
 Tito Lara, composer and musician
 Lolita Lebrón, nationalist leader
 Muna Lee, writer and first wife of Luis Muñoz Marín
 Gilberto Monroig, singer
 Samuel R. Quiñones, politician
 Evaristo Ribera Chevremont, poet
 Ramón Rivero (Diplo), actor and comedian
 Ángel Rivero Méndez, soldier, writer, journalist and businessman credited with inventing "Kola Champagne"
 Pedro Salinas, Spanish poet
 Luis Sánchez Morales, politician
 Miguel Ángel Suárez, actor
 Salvador Tió Montes de Oca, writer, poet, journalist
 Rafael Tufiño, painter and graphic artist

See also

 List of Puerto Ricans
 El Cañuelo
 Castillo San Cristóbal (San Juan)
 La Perla

References

External links

 
 Photographic slideshow on Flickr

Cemeteries in Puerto Rico
Geography of San Juan, Puerto Rico
1863 establishments in Puerto Rico
Buildings and structures in San Juan, Puerto Rico
Tourist attractions in San Juan, Puerto Rico